The 1971 Quirino creation plebiscite was a plebiscite on the separation of the sub-province of Quirino from the province of Nueva Vizcaya in order to become its own province as stipulated in Republic Act No. 6394 that was passed on September 10, 1971.

The plebiscite was held on November 8, 1971, and the results were announced on February 22, 1972.

Results

Summary

By municipality

References 

1971 referendums
1971 in the Philippines
Provincial plebiscites in the Philippines
Administrative division referendums